Peter Neilson may refer to:

Peter Neilson (footballer) (1890 – after 1913), Scottish footballer
Peter Neilson (poet) (1795–1861), Scottish businessman, author, and naval inventor
Peter Neilson (politician born 1879) (1879–1948), New Zealand MP for Dunedin Central
Peter Neilson (politician born 1954) (1954–2022), New Zealand MP for Miramar

See also
Peter Nielsen (disambiguation), multiple people